Stephanie Hill (born 8 January 1995) is an English academic, singer, actress, model, dancer and beauty pageant titleholder who won Miss England 2017. She represented England at Miss World 2017 held in Sanya, China on 18 November 2017 and was 2nd runner-up. She also competed at Miss Universe United Kingdom 2020 on March 8, 2021.

Early life
She was born in Sheffield, England. She graduated from the Sheffield Hallam University with a First Class Bachelor of Science Degree with Honours in Radiotherapy and Oncology, as well as graduating from The University of Sheffield with a Master's degree in Translational Oncology. She has been placed at Horse of the Year Show.

Career

Miss England 2017
Representing Hope Valley, Hill was crowned Miss England 2017 by outgoing titleholder Elizabeth Grant after bested 49 other delegates at the national finale held at Resorts World Birmingham on 14 July 2017. The win qualified her to represent her country at Miss World 2017 which was later held on 18 November 2017 in Sanya, China.

Miss World 2017
During the process of the pageant, Hill managed to be shortlisted in three challenge events: top 20 at Beauty With A Purpose; top 8 at Multimedia; and 3rd runner-up at Talent. She also won continental title, Miss World Europe. On the final night she was 2nd runner-up; making her the most successful contestant ever to represent England at the competition.

Miss Universe Great Britain 2020
On March 8, 2021, Stephanie Hill competed in Miss Universe Great Britain 2020, which was held virtually. Despite being a heavy favourite at the said competition, Stephanie failed to win the coveted title. The winner of Miss Universe Great Britain 2020 was Jeanette Akua from Central London. Akua will represent Great Britain at Miss Universe 2020, held in Florida. After this competition ended, Stephanie Hill will continue to work focusing on Urgent Public Health Studies, focusing on COVID-19 clinical trials.

References

External links

1995 births
Living people
Chinese beauty pageant winners
English female models
Miss World 2017 delegates
People from Derby
21st-century English women
21st-century English people